Tom Chamberlain (born 1 February 1987 in Kaitaia, New Zealand) is a rugby union footballer.   His regular playing position is blindside flanker.  He represents the Melbourne Rebels in Super Rugby having previously played for the Blues in his home country.

External links 
itsrugby.co.uk profile

Living people
1987 births
New Zealand rugby union players
Rugby union flankers
People from Kaitaia
Blues (Super Rugby) players
Melbourne Rebels players
North Harbour rugby union players
Southland rugby union players
New Zealand expatriate sportspeople in Australia
Expatriate rugby union players in Australia
Rugby union players from the Northland Region